Paradise FC is a Barbadian football club, based in Dover near Saint Lawrence Gap in the southern parish of Christ Church.

They play in the Barbadian first division, the Barbados Premier League.

Current squad

Achievements
Barbados Premier League: 4
 1989, 1996, 2001, 2003

Barbados FA Cup: 6
 1996, 1999, 2000, 2003, 2005, 2018

References

Football clubs in Barbados